Film1 Premiere (formerly known as Film1.1) is a Dutch premium television channel owned by SPI International. It is the flagship channel of the premium television service Film1. Film1 launched with its sister service Sport1 on 1 February 2006 and replaced the Canal+ Netherlands television channels. Film1 offers multiple channels with Dutch and international film and television series productions. Films are first shown on prime time on Film1 Premiere. On 25 February 2011, Film1.1 was rebranded as Film1 Premiere.

The channel is available from most digital cable and IPTV providers, and satellite provider CanalDigitaal. DVB-T provider Digitenne does not provide Film1.

See also
 Digital television in the Netherlands
 Television in the Netherlands

External links
 film1.nl 
 alleenopeen.tv

References

Television channels in the Netherlands
SPI International
Television channels and stations established in 2006
Mass media in Amsterdam